{{Infobox football club
| clubname = Móstoles
| image = Móstoles CF.png
| image_size = 
| fullname = Móstoles Club de Fútbol
| nickname = 
| founded = 2006 {{small|(as UD Móstoles)}}
| ground = El Soto, Móstoles,Madrid, Spain
| capacity = 14,000
| chairman = Antonio Gómez
| chrtitle = President
| mgrtitle = Manager
| manager = Jesús Lucas
| league = Preferente – Group 2
| season = 2020–21
| position = 3ª – Group 7 (B), 11th of 113ª – Group 7 (E), 8th of 11
| website = http://www.mostolescf.com/
| pattern_la1 = 
| pattern_b1 = 
| pattern_ra1 = 
| pattern_sh1 = 
| pattern_so1 =
| leftarm1 = 6495ED
| body1 = 6495ED
| rightarm1 = 6495ED
| shorts1 = 0000CD
| socks1 = 0000CD
| pattern_la2 = 
| pattern_b2 = 
| pattern_ra2 = 
| pattern_sh2 = 
| pattern_so2 =
| leftarm2 = FF0000
| body2 = FF0000
| rightarm2 = FF0000
| shorts2 = FF0000
| socks2 = FF0000
| current = 
}}
Móstoles Club de Fútbol, previously Unión Deportivo Móstoles, is a Spanish football team based in Móstoles, in the autonomous community of Madrid. Founded in 2006, it plays in Preferente de Madrid – Group 2, holding home games at Estadio El Soto, which has a 14,000-seat capacity.

History
Founded in 2006 under the name of Unión Deportivo Móstoles, the club was renamed Móstoles Club de Fútbol'' in 2013 after a club in the city, CD Móstoles, was dissolved. The club first reached the Preferente (fifth tier) in 2019, achieving their second promotion after the name change.

In the 2019–20 season, Móstoles won their Preferente group, achieving promotion to Tercera División and winning a place in the 2020–21 Copa del Rey.

Season to season

UD Móstoles

Móstoles CF

1 season in Tercera División

References

External links
 
Soccerway team profile

Sport in Móstoles
Football clubs in the Community of Madrid
Association football clubs established in 2006
2006 establishments in Spain